Kelk or KELK may refer to:

Places 
Kelk, East Riding of Yorkshire, a civil parish in the East Riding of Yorkshire, England
Kelk, Iran (disambiguation)
Elk City Municipal Airport (ICAO code:ELK) an airport in Oklahoma, US
 Kelč, a town in the Czech Republic

Other uses 
KELK, an American radio station
Jackie Kelk, an American radio actor
Kelk Baronets
Sir John Kelk, 1st Baronet (1816–1886), British contractor and politician